Tiberius Julius Pollienus Auspex (fl. 3rd century AD) was a Roman senator who was appointed suffect consul between AD 212 and 222.

Biography
Julius Pollienus Auspex, a member of the possibly Italian gens Polliena, was probably the son of Pollienus Auspex, although some scholars have maintained that both men are the same individual. Some time between AD 212 and 222, Auspex was appointed the Legatus Augusti pro praetore of the province of Numidia. He was also during this period appointed suffect consul in absentia.

Julius Pollienus Auspex may have been the adoptive father of Tiberius Pollienus Armenius Peregrinus, consul in AD 244.

Sources
 Mennen, Inge, Power and Status in the Roman Empire, AD 193-284 (2011)

References

3rd-century Romans
Julius
Suffect consuls of Imperial Rome
Year of birth unknown
Year of death unknown